Tebogo Jacko Magubane (born 21 February 1982) also known by his stage name Magubane da Franchiz (stylized as FranchiZ) is a South African house DJ and Music Producer radio producer currently working for Munghana Lonene FM as the station's Programmes Manager.

Early life 

Magubane was born in Winterveldt, Tshwane and his family later moved to Kromkuil, also in Pretoria. There Magubane's dreams of becoming an entertainer and radio presenter began to be realised. As a student at the Tshwane University of Technology (TUT), he joined the campus based radio station TUT Top Stereo 93.6 (Now Tshwane FM)as presenter for the breakfast show "The First Beat"in 2006 a slot he hosted until February 2008 before moving to the afternoon drive show "The Off Ramp" in. Magubane was concurrently working for the TUT as a student publication editor, a post he held from 2004 until his permanent departure from the university in March 2008 when he joined Munghana Lonene FM as a presenter

Education

Magubane started school in 1988 at Khensani Primary School in Soshanguve where he completed standard 4 in 1993 then moving to D.C. Marivate Middle School where he completed Standard 7 in 1996.  He completed high school in 1999 at Hlanganani High School. He then enrolled with a private college to complete a Diploma in Administration then in 2001 he started studying accounting at Technikon Pretoria (now TUT). While at TUT he participated in a lot of extramural activities and also represented the institution at a national level in debating. In October 2018 he graduated with a law degree (LLB) from Unisa.

Radio career

Early days on Campus Radio
When he was still a child, no one expected that Tebogo would end up on radio. He was a shy and reserved child, often bullied until his matric year. However he was always a high achiever academically and very competitive.

Magubane's radio career started in 2006 when he joined TUT Top Stereo as a presenter in October 2006 hosting the Breakfast show "The First Beat".  He joined the SABC in 2008 as a presenter and was appointed producer in October 2008. In 2014 he was appointed as a Specialist Producer for Sound and Imaging while he maintained his on-air presence and producer and traffic presenter on the station's flagship breakfast show, Phaphama. Magubane was officially announced as Munghana Lonene FM's new Programmes Manager on 1 September 2018, a position he currently occupies.

Joining Munghana Lonene FM
After joining Munghana Lonene FM in March 2008, Magubane went on air for the first time on the station on 24 March. He then presented the International Top 30 on Saturdays from 20:00 – 22:00 and Ta Mbilu Yanga at 22:00 – 02:00 on Sundays. He then applied to become a producer with the aim of exploring his radio skills.  Magubane produced popular shows such as Phaphama (Breakfast Show), Mahlamba-Ndlopfu, the Top 30 and Khuluka na mina. He can speak 10 out of the 11 official languages. He is a versatile media practitioner who does a few activities which include amongst others eventing, voice art and professional Programme Directing and debating coaching. In 2009 DJ Brian and Sydney Baloyi on Phaphama as the show's producer, a move that saw the show reaching new heights. Resulting of Phaphama's Success, DJ Brian was moved to the Afternoon Drive and paired with Thembzana Reloaded to boost the listenership. Magubane was retained as a producer with Sydney Baloyi and Conny Mashimbye with Rhandzu Optimus running the sports desk on the show. In 2015 the station had another major Daytime Line Up switch with DJ Brian and Sydney reuniting on the Breakfast show rejoining Rhandzu Optimus and Magubane who now also had an additional role as the Shows Traffic Presenter over and about being the Show's content and technical producer. He carried on juggling various roles at the station till his appointment as Munghana Lonene FM's Programmes Manager on 1 September 2018.

Disc jockey career

In 2009, Magubane started venturing into deejaying.  He occasionally acted as a host for major festivals and concerts.
Magubane is known for his blend of commercial house mixing and passion for drums. he features on various Munghana Lonene FM slots doing live mixes. Magubane has shared the stage with Big names such as Ralf Gum, Oskido, Ganyani and DJ Sbu.

On 1 November 2016 Magubane released a soulful house song titled "Usandidaro" featuring Zimbabwean born UK based vocalist Oluhle. As a follow up a year later Magubane released a parody house song "Anikarhali".

Significance
Magubane is particularly significant for breaking cultural stigmas hampered by South African Public Broadcast Radio of previous generations. By becoming the first presenter turned produced at a full-spectrum Xitsonga radio station being originally zulu and only have learned the language at school

Awards

Munghana Lonene FM Staff Excellence Awards
The Munghana Lonene FM Staff Excellence Awards were created to honour staff at Munghana Lonene FM for exceptional work in the station.

References

External links
Munghana Lonene FM

Living people
1982 births
South African radio personalities
People from Pretoria
South African radio producers
Tshwane University of Technology alumni